Thompson & Odell (ca.1874 – ca.1905) of Boston, Massachusetts, published music and repaired and manufactured musical instruments. Musicians Charles W. Thompson and Ira H. Odell ran the business. They kept a shop on Tremont Street and later on Washington Street. Towards 1900 "Carl Fischer purchased their catalogs of fretted instrument, band and orchestra music. ... About 1905 the Vega Company took over their manufacturing interests."

References

Images

External links

1870s establishments in Massachusetts
19th century in Boston
20th century in Boston
Economic history of Boston
Music publishing companies of the United States
1900s disestablishments in Massachusetts
Musical instrument manufacturing companies based in Boston
Defunct companies based in Massachusetts
Defunct mass media in Boston